Úna O'Connor (1938 – 4 March 2020) was an Irish sportsperson who played senior camogie with Dublin from 1953 until 1975. She is regarded as one of the greatest players of all time, a member of the team of the century. the first camogie player to win a Caltex award in 1966, and the Gaelic Weekly all-star award winner in 1967.

Early life
Úna O'Connor was born in Fairview, Dublin in 1938. The youngest of eight children, her mother died when she was just eighteen years old.  O'Connor grew up in Dublin at a time when the county's Gaelic footballers were successful. She was a great admirer of Kevin Heffernan and often received coaching advice from him before she played in big games.

Playing career

Club
O'Connor played her club camogie with the Celtic club in Dublin.  She enjoyed much success with Celtic, winning ten Dublin county camogie championship titles in all.  She was also one of the key players when the club won the first All-Ireland club camogie championship in 1964.

Inter-county
In 1953 O'Connor won her first All-Ireland medal with Dublin.  Although she was only fifteen years old, she showed exceptional talent by scoring three goals in the defeat of Tipperary. After that, O’Connor collected two additional All-Ireland medals in 1954 and 1955.

In 1957 Dublin reached the All-Ireland final once again. However, O’Connor was out of favour with the management and was not in the starting line-up for the game. With Dublin struggling with ten minutes left in the game, O’Connor was brought on and showed her talent once again by scoring the winning goal. Although she was only 19, she had just won her fourth All-Ireland medal. This victory began an amazing run of success that by 1966 saw O’Connor win ten All-Ireland medals in a row. This achievement is unique to O’Connor and one that is unlikely to be ever equalled. In 1963 and 1964 she had the honour of captaining her native county to back-to-back victories.

In 1967 O’Connor appeared in another All-Ireland final. However, Antrim gained revenge on Dublin by beating them in the All-Ireland final replay. In spite of this, she received the Caltex Award for best player of the year, thus becoming the first camogie player to be so honoured. In 1975 O’Connor came out of retirement to play in the Leinster championship against Wexford. Once again she showed her versatility by playing as a full-back, while she previously played as a forward.

Retirement
In retirement, O'Connor's reputation as one of the greatest players of all time has grown.
Her haul of thirteen All-Ireland medals is a record that stands second to her county colleague Kathleen Mills, who heads the honours list with fifteen medals. In 2004 O’Connor was named in the wing-forward position on a special team picked to celebrate the centenary of Cumann Camogaíochta na nGael.

References
Notes

Sources
 Brendan Fullam, Captains of the Ash, (Wolfhound Press, 2002).

1938 births
2020 deaths
Dublin camogie players
Sportspeople from Dublin (city)
People from Fairview, Dublin